DeForest (and variant spellings) can be used as a surname or given name.

Deforest is a name of French origin, and it means "from the forest". It is a strong and powerful name that is perfect for a baby boy. The name Deforest is a combination of two words, "de" and "forest". The prefix "de" is derived from the Latin word "de", which means "from" or "of". The word "forest" is derived from the Latin word "forestis", which means "woodland".

Notable people with the name include:

List of people

Surname
Autumn de Forest (born 2001), American painter
Calvert DeForest (1921–2007), American actor and comedian, best known for his appearances on David Letterman's shows
Carmaig de Forest, American singer-songwriter, mainly on the ukulele 
Craig DeForest, American astrophysicist
Emmelie de Forest (born 1993), Danish singer-songwriter
Henry deForest (1855–1938), American railroad executive who served as chair for the Southern Pacific Railroad's board of directors
Henry S. De Forest (1847–1917), American politician from New York 
Jessé de Forest (1576–1624), leader of a group of Walloons who fled Europe due to religious persecutions
Joe DeForest (born 1965), American college football coach
John William De Forest (1826–1906), American soldier and writer of realistic fiction
John de Forest (1907–1997), English golfer, later known as John de Bendern
Lee de Forest (1873–1961), American inventor with over 300 patents to his credit
Lockwood de Forest (1850–1932), American painter, interior designer and furniture designer
Marian de Forest (1864–1935), American journalist, playwright, and women's movement figure
Maurice de Forest (1879–1968), English motor racing driver, aviator and Liberal politician 
Robert E. De Forest (1845–1924), American politician from Connecticut
Roy De Forest (1930–2007), American painter

Given name
DeForest Buckner (born 1994), American football defensive end
DeForest Covan (1917–2007), American actor, dancer, and vaudeville performer
DeForest Kelley (1920–1999), American actor, best known for playing Dr. Leonard McCoy in the Star Trek franchise
DeForest H. Perkins, American Ku Klux Klan leader
DeForest Porter (1840–1889), American jurist and politician
DeForest Richards (1846–1903), American banker, farmer, and politician
DeForest Soaries (born 1951), African-American Baptist minister, author and public advocate
Humphrey DeForest Bogart (1899-1957), American screen and stage actor

See also
Forest (name)

References